Moinot Ghat (also known as Mini Cox's Bazar) is a tourist attraction in Dohar Upazila of Dhaka.

Location 
Mainot Ghat is a place in Dohar upazila of Dhaka District. Across the river Bhadrasan of Faridpur on the river.

References

Tourist attractions in Dhaka